Purkiss is a surname. Notable people with the surname include:

Anne-Katrin Purkiss (born 1959), German photographer
Ben Purkiss (born 1984), British footballer 
Diane Purkiss (born 1961), British literary historian
William Purkiss (1844–1906), Australian politician